Charles Maurice Donnay (12 October 1859 – 31 March 1945) was a French dramatist.

Biography
Donnay was born of middle-class parents in Paris in 1859. His father was a railway engineer and initially Donnay followed a similar profession, studying at the École centrale des arts et manufactures in 1882.

With Alphonse Allais, Donnay started by writing material for the celebrated cabaret le Chat noir.

Donnay made his serious debut as a dramatist on the little stage of Le Chat Noir with Phryne (1891), a series of Greek scenes. 
This was followed by Lysistrata, a four-act comedy, was produced at the Grand Théâtre in 1892 with Gabrielle Réjane in the title part. 
With Amants in 1895 he won a great success, and the play was hailed by Jules Lemaître as the Bérénice of contemporary French drama. It was the first work of a series called .
His plays were performed by famous actors including Cécile Sorel, Réjane et Lucien Guitry. They showed what was at the time advanced ideas on the relationship between the sexes, and used everyday language in their dialogue. 

On 14 February 1907, Donnay was elected a member of the Académie française, replacing Albert Sorel.

Works

Donnay's plays included:
Phryné (1891)
Lysistrata (1892), in collaboration with Maurice Leblanc (Act II, scene 7. However, Donnay would not admit it.)
Folle Entreprise (1894)
Pension de famille (1894)
Complices (1895), in collaboration with M. Groselande
Amants (1895), produced at the Renaissance theatre with Mme Jeanne Granier as Claudine Rozeray
La Douloureuse (1897)
L'Affranchie (1898)
Georgette Lemeunier (1898)
Le Torrent (1899), at the Comédie Française
Éducation de prince (1900)
La Clairière (1900)
Oiseaux de passage (1904), in collaboration with Lucien Descaves
La Bascule (1901)
L'Autre danger, at the Comédie Française (1902)
Le Retour de Jérusalem (1903)
L'Escalade (1904)
Paraître (1906) Comédie-Française with Berthe Cerny as Christiane Margès
Le Ménage de Molière (1912)
Les Éclaireuses (1913)
L'Impromptu de Paquetage (1916)
Le Théâtre aux armées (1916)
He also published some wartime essays and addresses:
La Parisienne et la Guerre (1916)
Premières Impressions après (1917)
Lettres à la Dame Blanche (1917)
Pendant qu'ils sent à Noyon (1917)
La Chasse à l'Homme (1919)

References 

1859 births
1945 deaths
Writers from Paris
19th-century French dramatists and playwrights
20th-century French dramatists and playwrights
Lycée Louis-le-Grand alumni
École Centrale Paris alumni
Members of the Académie Française